Armenia participated in the Junior Eurovision Song Contest 2019, held in Gliwice, Poland on 24 November 2019. The Armenian broadcaster Armenian Public Television (ARMTV) was responsible for organising their entry for the contest. Karina Ignatyan was chosen with her song "Colours of Your Dream".

Background

Prior to the 2019 contest, Armenia had participated in the Junior Eurovision Song Contest twelve times since its first entry in 2007, with their best result being in  when they won with the song "Mama", performed by Vladimir Arzumanyan. Armenia went on to host the Junior Eurovision Song Contest 2011 in the Armenian capital Yerevan.  In the 2018 contest, Levon represented country in Minsk, Belarus with the song "L.E.V.O.N". The song ended 9th out of 20 entries with 125 points.

Before Junior Eurovision

Depi Mankakan Evratesil 2019 
Depi Makankan Evratesil 2019 ("Towards Junior Eurovision 2019") was the second edition of the national final  and selected the Armenian entry for the Junior Eurovision Song Contest 2019. The competition took place on 15 September 2019 at the AMPTV studios in Yerevan. Ten entries competed and the winner was determined by the combination of votes from international and Armenian jury panels and a public vote. The show was broadcast on Armenia 1 as well as online via the broadcaster's website 1tv.am.

Competing entries
A submission period for artists was held from 19 June 2019. Auditions were held to select the participants for the live show, and the ten finalists were revealed on 3 September 2019.

Final
The national final took place on 15 September 2019. The winner was decided through a combination of SMS voting (1/3), an international adult jury (1/3) and an international kids jury (1/3). At the end of the event, Karina Ignatyan (born on 7 July 2006) was selected with the song "Colours of Your Dream". The song was written by Taras Demchuk, Avet Barseghyan and Margarita Doroshevish and contained lyrics in Armenian and English.

At Junior Eurovision
During the opening ceremony and the running order draw which both took place on 18 November 2019, Armenia was drawn to perform 15th at the 24 November 2019 contest, following Netherlands and preceding Portugal. Vika Martirosyan was the organizer and choreographer of the dance in both the music video and stage performance. The Armenian entry came 9th with 115 points.

Voting

Detailed voting results

References

Junior Eurovision Song Contest
Armenia
2019